William Vogt (15 May 1902 – 11 July 1968) was an American ecologist and ornithologist, with a strong interest in both the carrying capacity and population control. He was the author of best-seller Road to Survival (1948), National Director of the Planned Parenthood Federation of America and secretary of the Conservation Foundation.

Biography 

William Vogt was born in Mineola, New York. After graduating with honors in 1925 from St. Stephens (now Bard) College, he was, among other things, an early opponent of marshland drainage for mosquito control and later assumed a series of positions that gave him the opportunity to further pursue his interests in birds and the environment.

Road to Survival 
In 1942, he was made Associate Director of the Division of Science and Education of the Office of the Coordinator of Inter-American Affairs. Later he served as Chief of the Conservation Section of the Pan American Union, through which he was given the opportunity to study the relationship between climate, population and resources in various Latin American countries. These experiences formed the background to the perspective he later elaborated on in his Road to Survival (1948), a book motivated by his strong belief that then-current trends in fertility and economic growth were rapidly destroying the environment and undermining the quality of life of future generations. Vogt's most significant contribution was to link environmental and perceived overpopulation problems, warning in no uncertain terms that current trends would deliver future wars, hunger, disease and civilizational collapse.

Road to Survival was an influential best seller. It had a big impact on a Malthusian revival in the 1950s and 60s. After its publication he dedicated many activities to the cause of overpopulation. From 1951 to 1962, he served as a National Director of the Planned Parenthood Federation of America. In 1964, he became the Secretary of the Conservation Foundation. He served as a representative of the International Union for the Conservation of Nature and Natural Resources to the United Nations until his death. "Upon his death on 11 July 1968, he was remembered for the provocative questions he had dared to ask and for tackling a subject matter that remained shrouded in controversy."

Legacy
According to Charles C. Mann, "Vogt...laid out the basic ideas for the modern environmental movement. In particular, he founded what the Hampshire College population researcher Betsy Hartmann has called 'apocalyptic environmentalism'—the belief that unless humankind drastically reduces consumption and limits population, it will ravage global ecosystems. In best-selling books and powerful speeches, Vogt argued that affluence is not our greatest achievement but our biggest problem. If we continue taking more than the Earth can give, he said, the unavoidable result will be devastation on a global scale. Cut back! Cut back! was his mantra."

Honors
In 1948, he was awarded the Mary Soper Pope Memorial Award in botany. In 1960 he was elected a Fellow of the American Association for the Advancement of Science.

Citations

General and cited sources 
 Robertson, Thomas (2012). The Malthusian Moment: Global Population Growth and the Birth of American Environmentalism. Rutgers University Press

1902 births
1968 deaths
20th-century American non-fiction writers
20th-century American zoologists
American ecologists
American ornithologists
American science writers
Fellows of the American Association for the Advancement of Science
Writers from New York (state)